Complete Best is a compilation album by Sweetbox that was released on 12 December 2007. It came packaged as two discs, the first entitled Classic Flavors, the second Fan Flavors. First press editions of the album also came presented in another box bearing the same artwork as the album.

Track listing 
Disc 1 [Classic Flavors]
 "Everything's Gonna Be Alright"
 "For The Lonely" (Geo's Remix)
 "Life Is Cool"
 "Addicted"
 "Cinderella"
 "Here Comes The Sun"
 "Superstar"
 "Don't Go Away" (Radio Version)
 "Everything's Gonna Be Alright" (Jade's Version)
 "Don't Push Me"
 "Hate Without Frontiers"
 "Sorry"
 "Sacred"
 "Testimony"
 "Human Sacrifice"
 "Lacrimosa"
 "Somewhere"
 "Crazy"
 "Liberty"
 "Trying To Be Me"
 "Read My Mind"
 "Miss You"
 "Everything's Gonna Be Alright -Reborn-

Disc 2 [Fan Flavors]
 "Shout (Let It All Out)" (Radio Version)
 "Life Is Cool" (Futah Remix)
 "Boyfriend"
 "That Night"
 "A Whole New World"
 "Real Emotion"
 "Bold & Delicious"
 "Pride"
 "Every Time" (All Grown Up Version)
 "Booyah, Here We Go" (Hot Pants Radio Mix)
 "Crown Of Thorns"
 "Over & Over"
 "Killing Me DJ"
 "After The Lights"
 "Shakalaka" (Video Version)
 "Chyna Girl"
 "Beautiful"
 "The Winner Takes It All"
 "Every Step"
 "Vaya Con Dios"
 "Time of My Life"
 "Read My Mind" (Crystal Edition)

Certifications

References

Sweetbox compilation albums
2007 greatest hits albums